The Adventures of Gil Blas (French: Les Aventures de Gil Blas de Santillane, Spanish: Una aventura de Gil Blas) is a 1956 French–Spanish adventure film directed by René Jolivet and Ricardo Muñoz Suay and starring Georges Marchal, Barbara Laage and Susana Canales. It is based on the eighteenth century novel Gil Blas by Alain-René Lesage.

The film's sets were designed by the art directors Sigfrido Burmann and René Hubert.

Cast
 Georges Marchal as Gil Blas de Santillane
 Barbara Laage as Antonia Caldera
 Susana Canales as Doña Caldera Mencia
 Jacques Castelot as Marquis de Mosquera
 Marthe Mercadier as Serafina
 Antonio Riquelme as Dr. Sangrado
 Georgette Anys as Maria
 Jean Lefebvre as Scipion
 Claude May as Camille
 Fernando Rey as Capitaine Rolando
 Claire Maurier as Paquita
 Carlos Larrañaga as Le Prince	
 Alexandre Rignault as L'aubergiste
 Paul Demange as Lamela
 Paul Préboist as Un homme de l'escorte

References

Bibliography
 Goble, Alan. The Complete Index to Literary Sources in Film. Walter de Gruyter, 1999.
 Klossner, Michael. The Europe of 1500-1815 on Film and Television: A Worldwide Filmography of Over 2550 Works, 1895 Through 2000. McFarland & Company, 2002.

External links

1956 films
Films directed by René Jolivet
Films directed by Ricardo Muñoz Suay
1950s French-language films
Spanish historical adventure films
French historical adventure films
1950s historical adventure films
Films set in the 16th century
1956 adventure films
Films scored by Augusto Algueró
1950s French films

fr:Les Aventures de Gil Blas de Santillane